Eduardo de los Angeles is a former president of the Philippine Stock Exchange, the financial stock market of the Philippines. He is a former dean of the Ateneo Law School, a private law school in Makati, Philippines.

He is a managing partner at Romulo Mabanta Buenaventura Sayoc and De Los Angeles, the third largest law firm in the country.

Early life and education

De los Angeles was born in 1942. He obtained a Bachelor of Arts degree from the Ateneo de Manila University in 1962, a Bachelor of Laws degree from the Ateneo Law School in 1966, and a Master of Laws degree from Columbia Law School of Columbia University in New York in 1970.

Career

De los Angeles has practiced law for several years. In the government, he was invited to serve as a Consultant in the Presidential Blue Ribbon Commission, and as Chairman in the Technical Committee of the Bureau of Higher Education of the Department of Education, Culture, and Sports (DECS), a cabinet-level department. He also acted as a Consultant in the Revision of Rules of Court Committee of the Philippine Supreme Court.

He was elected President of the Philippine Stock Exchange (PSE) in 1993. He is currently a Managing Partner at Romulo Mabanta, the third largest law firm in the country.

Academe

De los Angeles has been a Professorial Lecturer at the Ateneo Law School since 1971. He also taught as a Bar Reviewer in the school's pre-bar review programs. He was appointed as Dean of the law school in 1984. He served in this capacity until 1989.

Organizations

De los Angeles is active in various legal groups. He served as President of the Philippine Association of Law Professors in 1986; President of the Philippine Association of Law Schools in 1987; President of the Philippine Bar Association in 1992;  Chairman of the Legal Aid Committee of the Philippine Judicature Society; and Vice Chairman of the Committee on Legal Education of the ASEAN Law Association.

He is a member of the Integrated Bar of the Philippines (IBP) and the American Bar Association (ABA).

He is also a member of the Fraternal Order of Utopia.

External links
Philippine Stock Exchange
Romulo Mabanta Buenaventura Sayoc and De Los Angeles
Ateneo de Manila University Law School

References 

1942 births
Living people
20th-century Filipino lawyers
Filipino educators
20th-century Filipino businesspeople
Ateneo de Manila University alumni
Academic staff of Ateneo de Manila University
Columbia Law School alumni
21st-century Filipino businesspeople
21st-century Filipino lawyers